Perunika Glacier is an 8 km long and 3 km wide (average) roughly crescent-shaped glacier in eastern Livingston Island in the South Shetland Islands, Antarctica situated east of Pimpirev Glacier, south of Saedinenie Snowfield, southwest of Kaliakra Glacier, west of Huron Glacier, and north of Balkan Snowfield and the head of Huntress Glacier.

Its head is bounded by Pliska Ridge to the south-southwest, Nesebar Gap to the south, Wörner Gap to the east, and Bowles Ridge to the north-northeast. It drains northwestwards between Burdick Ridge and Bowles Ridge, then north of Rezen Knoll turns west-southwest and flows into the head of Emona Anchorage between Bulgarian Beach and Pimpirev Beach.

The glacier is heavily crevassed in its lower half, receiving ice influx also from Balkan Snowfield and from the part of the island’s ice cap that is located west of Hemus Peak and Gurev Gap and south of Saedinenie Snowfield, and is draining southwards.  It exhibits pyroclastic phenomena typical of the region’s glaciology and resulting from volcanic activities at Deception Island not 40 km away.

The glacier was mapped by the Spanish Servicio Geográfico del Ejército in 1991, the lower portion in greater detail. Bulgarian remapping of Perunika Glacier’s terminus from a survey made during the summer of 1995-96; mapping in 2005 and 2009 from the Bulgarian topographic survey Tangra 2004/05.

Perunika is the name of a village in the Rhodope Mountains in southern Bulgaria. A derivation of Perun, the name of ancient Slavic God.

Location

See also
 List of glaciers in the Antarctic
 Glaciology

Maps
 Isla Livingston: Península Hurd. Mapa topográfico de escala 1:25 000. Madrid: Servicio Geográfico del Ejército, 1991.
 L.L. Ivanov. Livingston Island: Central-Eastern Region. Scale 1:25000 topographic map.  Sofia: Antarctic Place-names Commission of Bulgaria, 1996.
 L.L. Ivanov et al. Antarctica: Livingston Island and Greenwich Island, South Shetland Islands. Scale 1:100000 topographic map. Sofia: Antarctic Place-names Commission of Bulgaria, 2005.
 L.L. Ivanov. Antarctica: Livingston Island and Greenwich, Robert, Snow and Smith Islands. Scale 1:120000 topographic map. Troyan: Manfred Wörner Foundation, 2010.  (First edition 2009. )
 Antarctic Digital Database (ADD). Scale 1:250000 topographic map of Antarctica. Scientific Committee on Antarctic Research (SCAR). Since 1993, regularly upgraded and updated.
 L.L. Ivanov. Antarctica: Livingston Island and Smith Island. Scale 1:100000 topographic map. Manfred Wörner Foundation, 2017. 
 A. Kamburov and L. Ivanov. Bowles Ridge and Central Tangra Mountains: Livingston Island, Antarctica. Scale 1:25000 map. Sofia: Manfred Wörner Foundation, 2023.

Notes

References
 Perunika Glacier SCAR Composite Antarctic Gazetteer
 Bulgarian Antarctic Gazetteer. Antarctic Place-names Commission. (details in Bulgarian, basic data in English)

External links
 Perunika Glacier. Copernix satellite image

Glaciers of Livingston Island